Amelands is a dialect of Dutch, spoken on the Wadden Sea island of Ameland. It is especially closely related to the Midslands dialect, spoken in the middle segment of the neighboring island of Terschelling. Amelands, which has about 2,900 speakers, is the only dialect of the Dutch Wadden Sea islands that seems to be maintaining itself in its community, whereas all the other Dutch or West Frisian island dialects are losing ground rapidly in favor of Standard Dutch.

Phonology
It is the only dialect of Dutch which does not feature final obstruent devoicing.

References

Bibliography

 

Dutch language